Zamirbek Zhumagulov (born 19 January 1972 in  Kyrgyz SSR, now Kyrgyzstan) who currently plays for FC Dordoi-Plaza. Zamirbek led the club scorers of Kyrgyzstan name Almazbek Chokmorov, with 268 goals.

References

External links
 

1972 births
Living people
Kyrgyzstan international footballers
Kyrgyzstani footballers
Association football forwards
FC Dordoi Bishkek players